Jorge Estévez Martínez is a Puerto Rican politician and the former mayor of Añasco. Estévez is affiliated with the Popular Democratic Party (PPD) who served as mayor from 2009 to 2021.

Tenure 
Jorge Estevens was mayor of Añasco for three terms. He won the 2016 election with 53% of the vote against Pablo Crespo, the PNP candidate, who won 44% of the vote. In 2020 he was defeated by the PNP candidate Kabir Solares who obtained 54% of the vote while Jorge Estevens obtained 39%.

During his tenure the mayor's most recognized projects are the remodeling of the town square and the market Square. His administration also created the town's convention Center and a community Center in Dagüey.

In 2019 Osvaldo Tubens a former candidate for mayor alleged the municipalities parks where not well maintained. In 2021 an investigation revealed that the municipal government had left multiple vehicles with simple issues rusting away resulting in a loss for the town. The incoming mayor also indicated that the municipal water park was abandoned with horses grazing on the public land nearby.

References

Living people
Mayors of places in Puerto Rico
Popular Democratic Party (Puerto Rico) politicians
People from Añasco, Puerto Rico
Year of birth missing (living people)